Kunapareddy Achyutha Vara Prasad, better known as Achyuth (1960 – 26 December 2002) was an Indian actor who primarily worked in Telugu films and television. He acted in over 50 films and 50 television shows. His accolades include five Nandi Awards. He is notable for his supporting roles in films including Thammudu and Bavagaru Bagunnara? He played lead roles in the popular Telugu TV serials Sthree, Seethapathi, Antharangalu and Anveshitha.

Personal life 
Achyuth was born in Machilipatnam, Krishna District of Andhra Pradesh to Kunapareddy Rama Rao and Kunapareddy Sujatha. He had two brothers and two younger sisters. He was married to Ramadevi and had two daughters, Sai Sujatha and Sai Sivani.

Acting career 
Achyuth made his debut as an actor with the film Taj Mahal, but the first release was Mangalyabalam. He was quite popular with serials like Himabindu, Sthree, Seethapathi, KranthiRekha, Antarangalu, and Anveshitha.

He acted with stars including ANR, Mammootty, Chiranjeevi, Balakrishna, Venkatesh, Pawan Kalyan and Mahesh Babu. He acted with Varsha in Thammudu, Vasu, and Simharasi.

Producer 
He produced ANR and Krishna in serials along with Pradeep, Ashok, and Kadambari Kiran.

Political views 
He supported the then chief minister N. Chandrababu Naidu in campaigning for TDP.

Filmography

Television 
 Himabindu
 Sthree
 Sthree Parvam
 Seethapathi
 Kranthi Rekha
 Antharangalu
 Anveshitha (1997–99)
 Anubandham
 Prathibimbalu

Death 
Achyuth died of a heart attack on 26 December 2002.

References 

2002 deaths
1960 births
People from Krishna district
Telugu male actors
Male actors in Telugu cinema
Male actors from Andhra Pradesh
Male actors in Telugu television
20th-century Indian male actors
21st-century Indian male actors
Nandi Award winners